The Sauber C24 was a Formula One car built by Sauber for the 2005 season.

The C24 was driven by Jacques Villeneuve and Felipe Massa, the first time Sauber had a non-European driver lineup.  The team didn't have a test driver. Sauber finished eighth in the Constructors' Championship scoring just 20 points - the team's lowest finish since 2000 season.

Overview 

The Sauber C24 was supposed due to be launched in Kuala Lumpur, Malaysia on 11 January to mark the 10th anniversary of Petronas, but the launch was cancelled due to the Asian tsunami disaster in 2004. This car was the first completely designed with the team's new wind tunnel at Hinwil. The engine was a Petronas 05A 3.0 V10.

Sponsorship and livery
Sauber went into 2005 season with sponsorship continuity. The livery had a sponsorship change with Red Bull sponsorship departing to Red Bull Racing after a nine-year alliance with Sauber. The front nose livery was changed to blue due to usage of Michelin Tires, previously the nose livery was white in 2001-2004 seasons. The team's main sponsor was Credit Suisse.

Sauber C24B
The Sauber team was taken over by BMW for the 2006 season. A C24B variant of the car fitted with BMW's P86 V8 Formula One engine was used in early testing between the 2005 and 2006 seasons in the hands of Nick Heidfeld and Jacques Villeneuve. On 27 November 2005, Heidfeld attended a Sauber seat fitting with his former boss Peter Sauber. On 28 November-2 December 2005, Heidfeld attended off-season testing at Barcelona in a C24B car using Michelin tyres. On 7–17 December 2005, Heidfeld and Villeneuve attended off season testing at Circuito de Jerez with the same car. Just before the launch of BMW Sauber F1.06, Heidfeld attended off-season testing with C24B car in the full white interim livery on 10–13 January 2006.

Complete Formula One results
(key)

* denotes Ferrari engine badged as Petronas

References

2005 Formula One season cars
C24